Scott Hazzard Allan (born May 27, 1946) is an American former sailor. He won the ICSA Coed Dinghy National Championship with the University of Southern California sailing team in 1967, and competed in the Flying Dutchman event at the 1972 Summer Olympics.

He also coached sailing at the United States Naval Academy.

References

External links
 

1946 births
Living people
American male sailors (sport)
Olympic sailors of the United States
Sailors at the 1972 Summer Olympics – Flying Dutchman
Sportspeople from Pasadena, California
USC Trojans sailors